Javier Romero (born November 1, 1964) is a Cuban-American radio and television host. He works for WAMR-FM, where he hosts El Desayuno and Univision. He was previously the co-host of Sábado Gigante. In 2021, he became the first Cuban American to be inducted in the Radio Hall of Fame.

Early life
Romero was born on November 1, 1964 in Santa Clara, Cuba. In 1969, he and his family went to live to Spain. Four years later, they settled in Connecticut and then moved to Miami.

Career
In 1991, Romero began to co-host Univision Saturday show Sábado Gigante, which was mainly hosted by Don Francisco. He stayed until the program ended in 2015.

Awards
2021 Radio Hall of Fame Inductee

References

External links

1964 births
Living people
People from Santa Clara, Cuba
Cuban emigrants to Spain
Cuban emigrants to the United States
Naturalized citizens of the United States
Radio personalities from Miami
Cuban radio presenters
American talk radio hosts
Cuban television presenters
American game show hosts
American radio DJs
Univision people